The Roman Catholic Diocese of Cyangugu is a diocese located in the city of Cyangugu in the ecclesiastical province of Kigali in Rwanda. Since 2021, the Catholic Diocese of Cyangugu is entrusted to Bishop Edouard Sinayobye. 

The Diocese of Cyangugu (in French Diocèse Catholique de Cyangugu) was established by Pope John Paul II on November 14, 1981. It was entrusted to Bishop Thaddeus Ntihinyurwa on January 24, 1982, as diocesan bishop until his appointment as Archbishop of Kigali on March 9, 1996, and as Apostolic Administrator of Cyangugu until January 2, 1997, when the pope appointed his successor, Bishop John Damascene Bimenyimana, who served as Bishop of the Diocese of Cyangugu until he died on March 11, 2018.

Leadership
 Bishops of Cyangugu 
 Thaddée Ntihinyurwa (1981.11.05 – 1996.03.09), appointed Archbishop of Kigali but soon became Apostolic Administrator here
 Archbishop Thaddée Ntihinyurwa (Apostolic Administrator 1996.03.25 – 1997.01.02)
Jean Damascène Bimenyimana (1997.01.02 - 2018.03.11)
Edouard Sinayobye (2021.02.06 - ...)

Parishes
 Shangi
 Nkanka
 Mibilizi
 Mwezi
 Muyange
 Nyamasheke
 Yove
 Cyangugu
 Nyabitimbo
 Hanika
 Tyazo
Mashyuza
Mushaka
nyakabuye

See also
Roman Catholicism in Rwanda

References

External links
 GCatholic.org 
 Catholic Hierarchy 
 Homepage du Diocèse catholique de Cyangugu (french)

Cyangugu
Roman Catholic dioceses in Rwanda
Christian organizations established in 1981
Roman Catholic dioceses and prelatures established in the 20th century